Janus is a planned NASA mission that will send dual space probes, Serenity and Mayhem, to visit asteroids that will be chosen prior to launch date. The mission is part of NASA's SIMPLEx program and was expected to be launched in October 2023 as a secondary payload on Falcon Heavy together with the Psyche spacecraft, but it was removed due to an inability to reach its target from that launch date. On 3 September 2020, Janus successfully passed Key Decision Point-C and was approved for the final design of hardware. The mission budget is limited to US$55 million. Currently the new launch date and new launch vehicle is yet to be confirmed.

Spacecraft 
The two small 36 kg spacecraft —which fall under the 180 kg mass limit for SIMPLEx missions — will conduct stand-alone planetary science missions. The spacecraft is jointly developed by two teams, based at the University of Colorado Boulder (led by Daniel Scheeres) and at Lockheed Martin (led by Josh Wood). The two spacecraft, Janus A and B, also go by Serenity and Mayhem.

Instruments 
The Janus team plans to image the two asteroids in visible and infrared light, using the ECAM-M50 (visible) and ECAM-IR3a (infrared) cameras. These cameras were developed by Malin Space Science Systems and successfully used on the OSIRIS-REx asteroid sample return mission.

Mission

Initial plan 
In 2020, NASA gave approval for the Janus mission to proceed to the next phase of development. The mission is managed by the Planetary Missions Program Office at NASA's Marshall Space Flight Center in Huntsville, Alabama, as part of the Solar System Exploration Program at NASA Headquarters in Washington, D.C. The program conducts space science investigations in the Planetary Science Division of NASA's Science Mission Directorate at NASA Headquarters, guided by NASA's agency priorities and the Decadal Survey process of the National Academy of Sciences. Janus is led by the University of Colorado Boulder, where the principal investigator (PI) is based, which will also undertake the scientific analysis for the mission. Lockheed Martin will manage, build and operate the spacecraft.

Delay and new targets 
Psyche's launch was again delayed on June 24, 2022, to an unspecified date after the end of 2022. It was removed from the Psyche mission on 18 November 2022, after an assessment determined that Janus would not be on the required trajectory to meet its science requirements as a result of Psyche’s new launch period.

References

External links 
 NSSDCA Janus Mission Page
 New SIMPLEx Mission to Send SmallSats on Longest Deep Space Journey to Date at NASA
 NASA's Janus Mission is Going to Visit Two Binary Asteroids at Universe Today
 Janus: A mission concept to explore two NEO Binary Asteroids by D. J. Scheeres et at.
 Where no spacecraft has gone before: A close encounter with binary asteroids by Daniel Strain at CU Boulder Today

NASA space probes
Lockheed Martin satellites and probes
Missions to asteroids
2023 in spaceflight